The British Surrealist Group was involved in the organisation of the International Surrealist Exhibition in London in 1936.

The London Bulletin was published by the Surrealist Group in England, according to the June 1940 edition (nos. 18-19-20), edited by E. L. T. Mesens.

Members
 Eileen Agar (1899–1991)
 Paul Nash (1889–1946)
 Emmy Bridgwater (1906–1999) 
 Ithell Colquhoun (1906–1988)
 David Gascoyne (1916–2001)
 Henry Moore (1898–1986)
 Herbert Read (1893–1968)
 Humphrey Jennings (1907–1950)
 Len Lye (1901–1980)
 Conroy Maddox (1912–2005)
 E. L. T. Mesens (1903–1971)
 Roland Penrose (1900–1984) 
 Toni del Renzio (1915–2007)
 Edith Rimmington (1902–1986)
 Julian Trevelyan (1910–1988)
 John Tunnard (1900–1971)
 Simon Watson Taylor (1923–2005)

See also
Surrealism
Birmingham Surrealists

External links
Emmy Bridgwater
Julian Trevelyan

British art
British artist groups and collectives
British surrealist artists
Surrealist groups